Alisa (Slavic analogue to the female name Alice) is a Serbian and Yugoslav pop rock band formed in Belgrade in 1984.

Alisa gained nationwide popularity in the late 1980s, disbanding with the outbreak of Yugoslav Wars. The band reunited at the beginning of 2000s, releasing one album before another disbandment. Alisa reunited once again in 2018.

Band history

1984–1991
Alisa frontman Miroslav "Pile" Živanović started his career as the vocalist for the band Zvučni Zid (Sound Barrier). He later moved to the heavy metal band Jedan smer (One Direction) and eventually formed the band Sedmi Krug (Seventh Circle), spending several years in unsuccessful attempts to gain attention of the audience and the media. In 1984, he formed Alisa with his Sedmi Krug bandmate Zoran Jančeski (guiatr), Predrag Cvetković (a former member of Slađana Milošević's backing band Ljudi, drums), Aleksandar Kićanović (keyboards) and Marko Glavan (a former BG5 member, bass guitar).

The band released their debut self-titled album in 1985. All the songs were written by keyboardist Jovan Stoiljković, former leader of Živanović's former band Zvučni Zid. Stojiljković wrote some of these songs during the 1970s, while he was leading the band Bicikl (Bicycle). He opted not to become an official member of Alisa, but to continue his cooperation with the band as a songwriter, writing their fairy tales-inspired songs. The album cover was designed by cartoonist and designer Jugoslav Vlahović. Although poorly produced, the album brought hits "Sanja" and "Vojskovođa" ("Warlord"). Thanks to these songs Alisa gained a large number of fans, especially in Serbia and Bosnia and Herzegovina, where they became teen stars. The album featured guest appearance by former BG5 member Saša Gnus on flute and saxophone. After the album release, Gnus became an official member of the band.

The band's second album, Da li si čula pesmu umornih slavuja (Have You Heard the Song of Tired Nightingales), released in 1987, was heavily influenced by the Sarajevo bands which performed folk-influenced pop rock. Once again, the songs were written by Stoiljković. The album was produced by Saša Habić, and featured guest appearances by keyboardist Laza Ristovski, Milovan Babić Trumpet Orchestra, gusle player Jova Vujičić (on the song "1389.", which was inspired by Serbian epic poems about the Battle of Kosovo") and folk singer Lepa Brena. Lepa Brena appeared in the song "Posle devet godina" ("After Nine Years"), originally not intended to be a duet. At the time of the album recording, she was visiting the studio, and, after hearing the song, expressed her desire to sing it with Živanović. "Posle devet godina" and "1389." would become the album's biggest hits. The album also featured a new version of the band's old hit "Vojskovođa". In 1988, Glavan left the band, and was replaced by Dušan "Golub" Karadžić.

Alisa's third album, Hiljadu tona ljubavi (Thousand Tons of Love), released in 1988 and also produced by Habić, featured similar folk influenced-pop rock sound. For the first time, Živanović wrote part of the songs, including the album's biggest hit, "Kesteni" ("Chestnut Trees"). After releasing the album Glupo je spavati dok svira Rock 'n' Roll (It's Dumb to Sleep while Rock 'n' Roll Is Playing) in 1989 and a number of shows, the band disbanded at the outbreak of Yugoslav Wars.

In 1996, Raglas Records released Alisa biggest hits compilation album entitled Zlatna kolekcija (Golden Collection).

2001–2002
Živanović and Cvetković reformed Alisa in 2001. The new lineup featured, beside Živanović and Cvetković, Dejan Resanović (bass guitar), Bojan Mišković (guitar), Predrag Stojković (keyboards) and Miloš Đurić (percussion). They released their comeback album, entitled simply Alisa, in 2001. Besides new songs, the album featured new versions of the band's old hits. The band released an animated video for the song "Boško Buha", with the title inspired by World War II Partisan hero Boško Buha. However, the video was soon taken down from TV stations due to the murder of the chief of Belgrade city police also named Boško Buha.

Alisa disbanded once again shortly after, and Živanović formed the band Vožd (Vozhd). Živanović also played bass guitar in the band Krug Dvojke (Circle of the Tram number Two, the name being a popular expression for the central part of Belgrade), recording the album Krug dvojke (2004) with them. Most of the songs for the album were written by Jovan Stojiljković.

2018-present
In 2018, the band reunited in the original lineup: Miroslav "Pile" Živanović (vocals), Predrag Cvetković (drums), Aleksandar Kićanović (keyboards), Zoran Jančeski (guitar) and Marko Glavan (bass guitar). In December 2018, the band released their comeback single "Pijane noći" ("Drunken Nights"), with lyrics written by the band's old associate Jovan Stoiljković and music written by Goran Vranić, but the comeback concerts were postponed due to the outbreak of COVID-19 pandemic in Serbia. In March 2020, the band released a new version of their old song "Blago onom ko te ne sanja" ("Blessed is the One Who Does not Dream of You").

In 2022, the band released the double compilation album Najbolje iz zemlje čuda (Best from Wonderland), featuring their old hits, as well as "Pijane noći" and the new version of "Blago onom ko te ne sanja". On December 17, the band will hold a concert in Belgrade Youth Center in order to celebrate their 35th anniversary. The group chose Belgrade Youth Center for the anniversary concert as they had their first concert in the venue.

Discography

Studio albums
Alisa (1985)
Da li si čula pesmu umornih slavuja (1987)
Hiljadu tona ljubavi (1988)
Glupo je spavati dok svira Rock 'n' Roll (1989)
Alisa (2001)

Compilation albums
Zlatna kolekcija (1996)
Najbolje iz zemlje čuda (2022)

References

Serbian pop rock music groups
Serbian power pop groups
Serbian folk rock groups
Yugoslav rock music groups
Musical groups from Belgrade
Musical groups established in 1984
1984 establishments in Yugoslavia